Edna Township may refer to:

 Edna Township, Cass County, Iowa
 Edna Township, Otter Tail County, Minnesota
 Edna Township, Barnes County, North Dakota

Township name disambiguation pages